Richard Phillip Dickson (born November 17, 1987) is a former American football player who played for the LSU Tigers from 2005–2009. He is the most productive tight end in school history with 90 receptions for 952 yards and 10 touchdowns. In 2010, he was signed by the Detroit Lions as an undrafted free agent.

References

External links
 Detroit Lions bio

1987 births
Living people
People from Moss Point, Mississippi
Players of American football from Mississippi
American football tight ends
LSU Tigers football players
Detroit Lions players